The Bydgoszcz eventsalso referred to as the Bydgoszcz crisis, or the Bydgoszcz provocationwere a series of events in Poland culminating in the beatings of delegates of the Solidarity movement by the forces called upon by the authorities during the session of the voivodship National Council on 19 March 1981, which was to discuss the running strike in Bydgoszcz. 

It was a turning point in the early history of Solidarity. Following the registration of Solidarity by the authorities of Poland in 1980, the farmers were also pushing for creation of a separate trade union, independent from the official system of power. The NSZZ RI Solidarność (Independent Self-Governing Trade Union of Individual Farmers Solidarity, also called Rural Solidarity) was created, but not legalized by the authorities. Because of that, on 16 March 1981 in Bydgoszcz a strike was proclaimed.

This forced the authorities to finally hold the meeting of the Voivodeship National Council, a governing body of the Bydgoszcz Voivodeship. The meeting was attended by several members of Solidarity, among them Jan Rulewski, Mariusz Łabentowicz and Roman Bartoszcze, who were to explain the reasons for the strike. However, the Council decided not to discuss the issue of Rural Solidarity, which made the members of Solidarity protest and they refused to leave the session. The authorities responded by calling in the Citizen's Militia and the ZOMO, who entered the seat of the Council and brutally beat and arrested the delegates of Solidarity, leaving in their wake torn banners, thrown papers, chairs and furniture. 

Even though the authorities had a monopoly on media, the underground press reported the Bydgoszcz events, and the matter became widely publicised in a matter of days. On 24 March, Solidarity decided to go on a nationwide strike to protest the violence against the delegates. The authorities conceded and on 25 March the deputy prime minister Mieczysław F. Rakowski started a conference with the leaders of the Solidarity. This led to the signing of the so-called "Warsaw accord" on 30 March 1981. According to the agreement, Solidarity was allowed to report the Bydgoszcz events on public television (the first such independent news behind the Iron Curtain since the 1940s) and the government pledged to continue the talks on registration of a trade union of farmers.

The events were extensively covered by the publication project "Kryzys Bydgoski 1981", a three-volume edition: a monograph with a DVD with film "14 dni. Prowokacja bydgoska", a collection of documents, and a collection of witness testimonies.

See also
1981 warning strike in Poland

References

External links
Lech Dymarski, Porozumienie Warszawskie, Aneks 44, 1986
Archived version  "Prowokacja bydgoska" 
 Documental movie (promotional material, sound and subtitles in Polish)

1981 labor disputes and strikes
1981 in Poland
History of Bydgoszcz
Solidarity (Polish trade union)